Mae Chai is a district (amphoe) of Phayao province in northern Thailand.

History
The District Mae Chai was abolished on 23 December 1917 and was incorporated into Mueang Phan district. It was recreated as a minor district (king amphoe) on 24 January 1963. It was upgraded to a full district on 28 July 1965. In 1977 the district was reassigned from Chiang Rai Province to the newly established Phayao Province.

Geography
The district is in the upper valley of the Ing River. West of the town Mae Chai is the 1,426 m high Doi Luang mountain of the Phi Pan Nam Range. It rises within a protected area in the Doi Luang National Park. To the east is the Nong Liang Sai Reservoir, and at the boundary to the Mueang District the Mae Pim Reservoir. Mae Puem National Park protects the Mae Puem National Conserved Forest and Dong Pradu Forest.

Neighboring districts are (from the north clockwise): Phan and Pa Daet of Chiang Rai province; Mueang Phayao of Phayao Province; and Wang Nuea of Lampang province.

Administration
The district is divided into six sub-districts (tambons), which are further subdivided into 65 villages (mubans). The township (thesaban tambon) Mae Chai covers parts of tambons Mae Chai and Si Thoi. There are a further six tambon administrative organizations (TAO).

References

External links
amphoe.com
Mae Puem National Park

Mae Chai